Claudia Ortiz de Zevallos Cano was Miss Perú 2003. On 9 April 2005, she was third runner-up in the Miss Asia Pacific pageant. Prior to that participation, she was a semi-finalist in both Miss Earth 2002 and Miss Universe 2003 pageants.

In 2016, she was guest judge in the final Miss Peru 2016 beauty pageant, celebrated in the Ecological Center and Studios of America Television Production, Pachacamac, Lima, Peru.

Notes

References

1981 births
Living people
Miss Earth 2002 contestants
Miss Universe 2003 contestants
People from Arequipa
Peruvian beauty pageant winners
Peruvian female models